Bishop's Landing Airport  is a privately owned public airport in Celina, Collin County, Texas, United States, located approximately  northeast of the central business district. The airport has no IATA or ICAO designation.

The airport is used solely for general aviation purposes.

Facilities 
 Runway 17/35: 1,580 x 80 ft. (482 x 24 m), Surface: Turf

For the 12-month period ending 31 December 2015, the airport had 600 aircraft operations, an average of 2 per day: 100% general aviation. At that time there were 2 aircraft based at this airport: 100% single-engine, with no ultralights, helicopters, gliders, multi-engine, or jets.

References

External links 
  at Texas DOT Airport Directory

Airports in Texas
Airports in the Dallas–Fort Worth metroplex
Transportation in Collin County, Texas